Pizzo is an Italian surname that may refer to
 Alberto Pizzo (born 1980), Italian pianist and composer
 Eraldo Pizzo (born 1938), Italian water polo player
 G. Pizzo, Italian rower who won a bronze medal at the 1906 Olympics
 Jason Pizzo (born 1976), American attorney and politician
 Manuela Pizzo (born 1991), Argentinian handball player
 Mickaël Pizzo (born 1979), French football player
 Paolo Pizzo (born 1983), Italian épée fencer
 Philip A. Pizzo (born 1944), American professor, physician, and scientist
 Phillip Pizzo (born 1950), known as The Mall Rapist, American serial rapist
 Salvatore Pizzo, American scientist
 

Italian-language surnames